Al-Bida ash-Sharqiyah (البیدع الشرقیه) is a settlement in Qatar, located in the municipality of Ad Dawhah.

References

Communities in Doha